Justice Hastings may refer to:

Bill Hastings (judge) (fl. 2000s–2020s), chief justice of the Republic of Kiribati
Serranus Clinton Hastings (1814–1893), chief justice of the Iowa Supreme Court
William C. Hastings (1921–2010), associate justice of the Nebraska Supreme Court

See also
Judge Hastings (disambiguation)